Strong Weakness is the eighth studio album by American country music duo The Bellamy Brothers. It was released in 1982 via Elektra and Curb Records. The album includes the singles "Redneck Girl", "When I'm Away from You", "I Love Her Mind" and "Strong Weakness".

Track listing

Personnel
Adapted from liner notes.

Bellamy Brothers Band
David Bellamy - lead and harmony vocals, acoustic guitar, electric piano on "Lazy Eyes"
Howard Bellamy - lead and harmony vocals, acoustic guitar
Randy Ferrell - electric & acoustic guitars
Donnie Helms - bass guitar
Dannie Jones - steel guitar, lap slide guitar, dobro
Jon LaFrandre - keyboards, background vocals
Juan "The Breeze" Perez - drums, percussion

Guest Musicians
Buddy Spicher - fiddle
Wally Dentz - harmonica
Dewey Dorough - saxophone
Rick Pupello - rhythm guitar
Lea Jane Berinati & Yvonne Hodges - background vocals

Chart performance

References

1982 albums
The Bellamy Brothers albums
Albums produced by Jimmy Bowen
Elektra Records albums
Curb Records albums